
Uniejowice  is a village in the administrative district of Gmina Zagrodno, within Złotoryja County, Lower Silesian Voivodeship, in south-western Poland. Prior to 1945 it was in Germany.

People 
 Hermann Theodor Hettner (1821–1882)

External links
 http://gov.genealogy.net/ShowObjectSimple.do?id=object_263779 (German)

References

Uniejowice